Black persimmon can refer to two dark-fruited species of the persimmon and ebony genus Diospyros:

 Diospyros nigra (Black sapote) from Central America
 Diospyros texana (Texas persimmon) from the lower Rio Grande region of Texas and Mexico